An orthodromic impulse runs along an axon in its anterograde direction, away from the soma.

In the heart, orthodromic may also refer to an impulse going in the correct direction from the dendrites to axon terminal (from the atria to the ventricles) in contrast to some impulses in re-entry.

See also
Antidromic
Action potential
Anterograde Tracing

References

Neurophysiology